Nasu–Hakola disease also known as polycystic lipomembranous osteodysplasia with sclerosing leukoencephalopathy is a rare disease characterised by early-onset dementia and multifocal bone cysts. It is caused by autosomal recessive loss of function mutations in either the TREM2 or TYROBP gene that are found most frequently in the Finnish and Japanese populations.

Signs and symptoms

Four stages are recognised in this condition. The first (latent stage) show no symptoms or signs. This stage typically lasts up to the early 20s. This is followed by the osseous stage. This is characterised by recurrent bone pain usually affecting the long bones of the limbs. This is usually followed by pathological fractures of these bones. The third stage (early neurological) is marked by the onset of symptoms typical of a frontal lobe syndrome (euphoria, lack of concentration, loss of judgment and social inhibitions) with memory loss. Epilepsy may occur. This stage usually has its onset in the late 20s and early 30s. The final stage is characterised by severe dementia and paralysis. Death usually occurs in the late 40s or early 50s.

Genetics

This condition has been associated with mutations in the TYRO protein tyrosine kinase binding protein (TYROBP) gene and in the triggering receptor expressed on myeloid cells 2 (TREM2) gene. TYROBP is located on the long arm of chromosome 19 (19q13.12) and TREM2 is located on short arm of chromosome 6 (6p21.1).

Pathopysiology

This is not understood but appears to involve the microglia.

Diagnosis

This syndrome may be suspected on clinical grounds. The diagnosis is established by sequencing the TYROBP and TREM2 genes.

Differential diagnosis
 Frontotemporal dementia

Investigations

X rays show the presence of bone cysts and osteoporosis. CT or MRI of the brain show loss of tissue in the frontotemporal lobes of the brain. Calcification of the basal ganglia is common. EEG is typically normal initially but diffuse slowing and irritative activity later.

Treatment

There is no specific treatment for this condition. Management is supportive.

Epidemiology

This condition is considered to be rare, with ~200 cases described in the literature. The estimated population prevalence is 2.0 x 10−6 in Finns.

History

This condition was first described in 1973.

References

Genetic diseases and disorders
Rare syndromes